Ciudad del Plata is a city in San José Department of Uruguay.

Geography
The city is bounded by the Santa Lucía River to the east and north, and by the Río de la Plata to the south. Spanning the 23rd to the 39th km of the Route 1 (also known as the "Brigadier General Manuel Oribe Highway"), Ciudad del Plata forms part of the conurbation of the capital Montevideo. Ciudad del Plata has an industrial core. The city is also known for the Jardines de Mater Terra, a private cemetery established 1993.

History 
The whereabouts of Ciudad del Plata were formerly known as Rincón de la Bolsa. It was a group of independent fragments, which became integrated into one populated centre, as a result of the westward expansion of the metropolitan area of Montevideo.

According to the legislative decree Nº 18.052, "the area enclosed by the River Santa Lucia, the Rio de la Plata and kilometre 35 of National Route 1" received city status under the name "Ciudad del Plata" on 25 October 2006, "integrating the areas Delta del Tigre y Villas, Playa Pascual, Parque Postel, Monte Grande and Santa Monica".

Population 
In 2006, an official estimate of its population was approximately 26,000 inhabitants. According to the 2011 census, Ciudad de la Plata has a population of 31,145
 
Source: Instituto Nacional de Estadística de Uruguay

Barrios 
The names of the various barrios (neighbourhoods) composing Ciudad del Plata are: Delta del Tigre, Sofima, Villa Rives, San Fernando, Autódromo Nacional, San Fernando Chico, Parque del Plata, Monte Grande, Safici (Parque Postel), Las Violetas, Penino, Santa Mónica, Santa María, Santa Victoria, San Luis, Playa Pascual, Villa Olímpica.

The populations of the five censual districts up to the 2011 census were as follows:

Source: Instituto Nacional de Estadística de Uruguay

Places of worship
 St. Joseph the Worker Parish Church (Roman Catholic)
 Delta del Tigre Parish Church (Roman Catholic)
 Iglesia de Jesucristo de los Santos de los Últimos Días

References

External links 
 Official site of Ciudad del Plata
 Map of Ciudad del Plata (3.3MB)
 Agency for the development of Ciudad de la Plata
 INE map of Delta del Tigre, Santa Mónica, Safici (Parque Postel) & Monte Grande
 INE map of Playa Pascual

Populated places in the San José Department
Populated places established in 2006
Populated coastal places in Uruguay